Shed is the debut studio album by American rock band Title Fight. It was released on May 3, 2011, through SideOneDummy Records. It received positive reviews, garnering an 81 on review aggregator Metacritic. It debuted at No. 8 on the Billboard Heatseekers chart.

Background
Compilation album The Last Thing You Forget was released in 2009. Bassist/vocalist Ned Russin said that since its release, the band members had "dropped out of school, seen the world and had life experiences".

Release
On January 20, 2011, it was announced that Title Fight had signed to independent label SideOneDummy Records, and would be releasing their debut album in the spring. On February 10, Shed was announced for release in May, revealing its track listing. In addition, the band gave away "27" as a free download on their Tumblr profile. Russin said that it would be "the first time we have a recording that's longer than seven minutes, so this is a long time coming". On April 27, the album's title-track was made available as a free download. Shed was made available for streaming on May 2, before being released the following day. On May 4, a music video was released for "27". In May and June, the band embarked on their first headlining US tour with support from Touché Amoré, The Menzingers, Dead End Path and Shook Ones.

In July 2011, the band went on a tour of the UK and Europe. On October 10, a music video was released for "Shed". In October and November, the band supported Four Year Strong on the AP Fall Tour. On November 21, a 7" vinyl was released featuring the outtakes "Missed" and "Dreamcatchers". On the same day, the group released a music video for "Coxton Yard". In February 2012, the band went on a tour of Japan, titled Alliance Trax A.T. Tour, alongside Foundation, Country Yard and Inside. In April and May, the group supported Rise Against on their US tour. In between dates on this tour, the band performed a number of headlining shows.

Track listing
All songs written by Title Fight.

Personnel
 Band
Jamie Rhoden – guitars, vocals
Ned Russin – bass, vocals
Shane Moran – guitars
Ben Russin – drums

 Production
 Walter Schreifels – production, vocals on "Safe In Your Skin"
 Will Yip – sound engineer, mixing
 Kim Rosen – mastering
 Dirk Fritz – layout
 Manny Mares – photography
 Alex Dow – photography
 Nathan Congleton – photography
 John Garrett Slaby – artwork

References

Title Fight albums
2011 debut albums
SideOneDummy Records albums